John Lubbock is the name of:
Sir John Lubbock, 1st Baronet (1744–1816)
Sir John Lubbock, 2nd Baronet (1774–1840), English banker
Sir John Lubbock, 3rd Baronet (1803–1865), English banker, barrister, mathematician and astronomer
John Lubbock, 1st Baron Avebury (1834–1913), English banker, politician, naturalist and archaeologist
John Lubbock, 2nd Baron Avebury (1858–1929), English aristocrat and banker
John Lubbock, 3rd Baron Avebury (1915–1971), English peer
 John Lubbock (conductor) (active from 1967), founder and conductor of the Orchestra of St John's, Smith Square